The ambassador of the United Kingdom to Sweden is the United Kingdom's foremost diplomatic representative in Sweden, and head of the UK's diplomatic mission in Stockholm.  The official title is His Britannic Majesty's Ambassador to the Kingdom of Sweden.

Earlier representation

For ambassadors from the Court of St. James's to Sweden before the creation of the United Kingdom of Great Britain and Ireland in 1801, see List of ambassadors of the Kingdom of England to Sweden (up to 1707) and List of ambassadors of Great Britain to Sweden (from 1707 to 1800).

List of heads of mission

Envoy Extraordinary and Minister Plenipotentiary at the Court of Stockholm
1800–1801: Diplomatic relations severed due to Second League of Armed Neutrality
1802–1804: Charles Arbuthnot
1804–1807: Hon. Henry Pierrepont
1807: Alexander Straton
1807: Hon. Henry Pierrepont special mission
1807–1808: Edward Thornton
1808–1809: Anthony Merry
1810–1812: Diplomatic relations severed due to Sweden's alliance with France
1811: Edward Thornton special mission
1812–1817: Edward Thornton
1817–1820: Viscount Strangford
1820–1823: William Vesey-FitzGerald
1823–1832: Benjamin Bloomfield, 1st Baron Bloomfield (created a baron in 1825)
1832–1833: Lord Howard de Walden
1833–1835: Sir Edward Cromwell Disbrowe
1835–1838: Hon. John Duncan Bligh
1838–1850: Sir Thomas Cartwright
1850: George John Robert Gordon, Chargé d'affaires
1851–1853: Sir Edmund Lyons

Envoy Extraordinary and Minister Plenipotentiary to the King of Sweden and Norway
1854–1859: Arthur Magenis 
1859–1872: George Jerningham 
1872–1881: Hon. Edward Erskine
1881–1884: Sir Horace Rumbold, Bt
1884–1888: Edwin Corbett
1888–1893: Sir Francis Plunkett
1893–1896: Sir Spenser St. John
1896–1901: Hon. Sir Francis Pakenham
1902–1904: Sir William Barrington
1904–1905: Rennell Rodd

Envoy Extraordinary and Minister Plenipotentiary to the King of Sweden
1905–1908: Sir Rennell Rodd
1908–1912: Cecil Spring Rice
1913–1918: Esme Howard
1919–1924: Colville Barclay
1924–1927: Arthur Grant Duff
1928–1930: Sir Tudor Vaughan
1931–1934: Sir Archibald Clark Kerr
1935–1937: Michael Palairet
1938–1939: Sir Edmund Monson, 3rd Baronet
1939–1945: Sir Victor Mallet
1945–1948: Sir Bertrand Jerram

Ambassadors to Sweden
1948–1951: Sir Harold Farquhar
1951–1954: Sir Roger Stevens
1954–1960: Hon. Sir Robert Hankey
1960–1963: Sir John Coulson
1963–1966: Sir Moore Crosthwaite
1966–1971: Sir Archibald Ross
1971–1974: Sir Guy Millard
1974–1977: Sir Sam Falle
1977–1980: Sir Jeffrey Petersen
1980–1984: Sir Donald Murray
1984–1987: Sir Richard Parsons
1987–1991: Sir John Ure
1991–1995: Robert Cormack
1995–1999: Sir Roger Bone
1999–2003: John Grant CMG (later Sir John Grant KCMG)
2003–2006: Anthony Cary
2006–2011: Andrew Jonathan Mitchell
2011–2015: Paul Johnston

2015–2019: David Cairns
2019–: Judith Gough

References

External links
UK and Sweden, gov.uk

Sweden
 
 
United Kingdom